Oxyopes tridens is a species of lynx spider in the family Oxyopidae. It is found in the United States and Mexico.

References

Oxyopidae
Articles created by Qbugbot
Spiders described in 1964